Quşçu Körpüsü (also, Kushchinskiy and Kushchinskiy Most) is a village in the Dashkasan Rayon of Azerbaijan.  The village forms part of the municipality of Quşçu qəsəbə.

References 

Populated places in Dashkasan District